The Air Staff is one of the Department of the Air Force's two statutorily designated headquarters staffs: the other staff is the Office of the Secretary of the Air Force, also known as the Secretariat. The Air Staff is headed by the Chief of Staff of the Air Force (currently General Charles Q. Brown Jr.). The Air Staff is primarily composed of uniformed U.S. Air Force officials who assist the Chief of Staff in carrying out his dual-hatted role: as the principal military advisor to the Secretary of the Air Force, and as a member of the Joint Chiefs of Staff.

The Air Staff was reorganized in 2006 to be numbered in accordance with the Joint Staff system.  For the most part, the Joint Staff numbering system applies to the air staff. The Air Force separated Analysis and Assessments from A8 to create a separate directorate, A9, then in 2008, followed up with the creation of a separate directorate, A10, for the Air Force's nuclear mission.

Joint Staff organization

For reference, the organization of the Joint Staff follows.  See full article.

The Joint Chiefs of Staff organization includes the following departments where all the Joint Staff's planning, policies, intelligence, manpower, communications and logistics functions are translated into action.

National Level Command Structure 
 DOM – Directorate of Management
 J1 – Manpower and Personnel
 J2 – Joint Staff Intelligence
 J3 – Operations (J3)
 J4 – Logistics 
 J5 – Strategic Plans and Policy
 J6 – Command, Control, Communications and Computer Systems (C4)
 J7 – Joint Force Development
 J8 – Force Structure, Resources, and Assessment

Air Staff
 A1 – Manpower and Personnel 
 A2 – Intelligence, Surveillance and Reconnaissance and Cyber Effects Operations 
 A3 – Operations
 A4 – Logistics
 A5 – Plans and Requirements
 A6 – Communications
 A7 – Installations and Mission Support
 A8 – Strategic Plans and Programs
 A9 – Studies, Analyses, and Assessments
 A10 – Strategic Deterrence and Nuclear Integration Office

Multiple Air Force military commands follow this structure, but for the HQ Air Force at the Pentagon, they combine several into one office (A5/8 and A4/7).  In addition, unlike the other branches of the U.S. armed forces that place "force development and training" in J7 like elements (i.e., G7, N7, etc.), the Air Force has no A7 "training" organization at the HAF level, retaining that function within its A3 organization.

Members of the Air Staff

Chief of Staff of the United States Air Force (O-10)
Vice Chief of Staff of the United States Air Force  (O-10) 
Director of Staff of the United States Air Force  (O-9)
Chief Master Sergeant of the Air Force (E-9)
Deputy Chief of Staff for Personnel (A1) (O-9)
Deputy Chief of Staff for Intelligence, Surveillance and Reconnaissance, and Cyber Effects Operations (A2/6) (O-9)
Deputy Chief of Staff for Operations (A3) (O-9)
Deputy Chief of Staff for Installations, Logistics & Force Protection (A4/7) (O-9)
Deputy Chief of Staff for Strategic Plans & Requirements (A5/8) (O-9)
Chief Information Officer (SAF/CN) (Senior Executive Service)
Director for Studies & Analyses, Assessments and Lessons Learned (A9) (Senior Executive Service)
Deputy Chief of Staff for Strategic Deterrence and Nuclear Integration (A10) (O-9)
Judge Advocate General (O-9)
Surgeon General (O-9)
Director, Air Force History and Museums Policies and Programs (Senior Executive Service)
Chief of the Air Force Reserve Command (O-9) 
Director of the Air National Guard (O-9) 
Director of Tests and Evaluation (Senior Executive Service)
Chief of Chaplain Services (O-8)
Chief of Safety (O-8)
Sexual Assault Prevention and Response (O-8)
Chief Scientist of the U.S. Air Force (Senior Executive Service)

Rapid Capabilities Office

The Air Force Rapid Capabilities Office, located in Washington, D.C., reports directly to a board of directors chaired by the Under Secretary of Defense for Acquisition, Technology, and Logistics. Board members also include the Secretary of the Air Force, the Chief of Staff of the Air Force, and the Assistant Secretary of the Air Force for Acquisition. The office responds to Combat Air Force and combatant command requirements.

The RCO reports to a board of directors comprising the undersecretary of defense for acquisition, technology and logistics and the secretary and chief of staff of the Air Force.  The office is staffed with a variety of functional specialists.

The Secretary of the Air Force activated the office 28 April 2003. One of its first projects was to deploy significant upgrades to the Integrated Air Defense System, now operational around the National Capital Region. Currently, RCO is working on the X-37B Orbital Test Vehicle to demonstrate a reliable, reusable, unmanned space test platform for the United States Air Force. Additionally, RCO, in conjunction with MIT Lincoln Lab and other partners, is developing a sensitive airborne receiver system. The system is scheduled for in-theater evaluation during the summer of 2009. The RCO Red Team assesses current and future threats to U.S. combat operations by providing independent technical assessments.

See also
Joint Chiefs of Staff

References

External links
Organization of the U.S. Air force
Countdown to A10 staff
Air Force Staff Restructures to Improve Joint Ops, Communication

Staff (military)
United States Air Force